Richard Uncapher is an American bass player who was born and raised Pittsburgh, Pennsylvania and lives in Chicago, Illinois. He has played in many different bands in Chicago, the most notable bands being Dan Vapid and the Cheats, Noise by Numbers, Textbook, Woolworthy, and The Addisons. He was born on March 3, 1970.

Partial discography

Woolworthy
 Sweet Second Place (1998)
 Blasted Into Ashes (2001, Boss Tuneage)
 Recycler (1996-2002) (2002, Boss Tuneage)

Textbook
 The Great Salt Creek (2005, Playing Field Recordings)
 Boxing Day Massacre (2008)
 Out of My Universe EP (2011)
 All Messed Up (2014, Torture Chamber Records)
 On The B-Side (Best of 2000 - 2015) (2016, Paper + Plastick Records)

Noise by Numbers
 Yeah, Whatever... (2009, Asian Man Records, Solidarity Recordings)
 Over Leavitt (2011, Jump Start Records)
 High on Drama EP (2015, Jump Start Records)

Dan Vapid & the Cheats
 Two (2013, Torture Chamber Records)

References

External links

1970 births
Living people
American punk rock bass guitarists
American male bass guitarists
Musicians from Pittsburgh
Guitarists from Pennsylvania
Dan Vapid and the Cheats members
Noise by Numbers members
21st-century American bass guitarists
21st-century American male musicians